Colossal Titan Strife is the second album from French brutal death metal band Kronos. Released December 25, 2004. It was recorded, mixed and engineered by Kris Belaen at CCR Studios Belgium from August 12 to September 6, 2003.

Track listing
All songs written by Kronos
"Mythological Bloodbath" 
"Colossal Titan Strife" 
"Submission"
"Opplomak"
"With Eaque Sword"
"Aeternum Pharaos Curse"
"Haterealm" 
"Monumental Carnage"
"Phaeton"
"Kronos"
"Infernal Worms Fields"

Credits

 Grams (rhythm guitar)
 Richard (lead guitar)
 Tom (bass and backup vocals)
 Mike (drums)
 Kristof (vocals)

2004 albums
Kronos (band) albums